John W. Tankersley Field is a baseball venue in Prairie View, Texas, United States. It is home to the Prairie View A&M Panthers baseball team of the NCAA Division I Southwestern Athletic Conference. The facility has a capacity of 512 spectators and is named for John Tankersley who was the head coach of the Panthers from 1969 to 1972, and again from 1975 to 2002.

Features 
The field's features include an grass playing surface, a press box, an electronic scoreboard, dugouts, a brick backstop, restrooms, and concessions.

See also 
 List of NCAA Division I baseball venues

External links
John W. Tankersley Field

References 

College baseball venues in the United States
Baseball venues in Texas
Prairie View A&M Panthers baseball